Southern Caspian sprat, Clupeonella grimmi, is a species of fish in the family Clupeidae. It is found in the brackishwater Caspian Sea, in its central and southern parts in the pelagic zone. It is a small fish, typically 11 cm length, and up to 14.5 cm maximum. Occurs not deeper that 32 m depth.

Sources
 Clupeonella grimmi at FishBase

Clupeonella
Fish of the Caspian Sea
Fish described in 1877